The Cowdin Stakes was an American Thoroughbred horse race held annually from 1923 through 2005 at Aqueduct Racetrack and at Belmont Park which at one time was a Grade 1 event.

Background
The Cowdin was first run in 1923 as the Junior Champion Stakes, a name taken from a very important race for two-year-olds which had been inaugurated in 1898 at Gravesend Race Track. The Junior Champion Stakes at Gravesend ended with the 1908 running when the racetrack was forced to close after the administration of Republican Governor Charles Evans Hughes signed into law the Hart–Agnew bill which effectively banned all racetrack wagering in New York State. The new Junior Champion Stakes at Aqueduct Racetrack was renamed the Cowdin Stakes in 1941 to honor John Cheever Cowdin, former president of the racetrack.

At its peak, the Cowdin Stakes was one of the important East Coast races for two-year-olds, a number of which would earn American Champion Two-Year-Old Colt honors. As well, 1929 winner Gallant Fox went on to win the 1930 U.S. Triple Crown and would be inducted into the U. S. Racing Hall of Fame. Other winners who would become Hall of Fame members were Twenty Grand (1930), Hill Prince (1949), Dr. Fager (1966), Foolish Pleasure (1974), Easy Goer (1988).

The race was split into two divisions in 1963, 1973, and 1976.

The Cowdin Stakes was held at:
 Aqueduct Racetrack : 1923–1956, 1959, 1962–1967, 1991–1997
 Belmont Park : 1956 to 1958, 1960 to 1962, from 1968 to 1990, 1998 to 2005

Records
Speed record:
 1:14.35 @ 6.5 furlongs – Coronado's Quest (1997)
 1:21.40 @ 7 furlongs – Devil's Bag (1983)
 1:36.60 @ 1 mile (8 furlongs) – Sailor Beware (1934)  &  Chief's Crown (1984)

Most wins by a jockey:
 5 – Jorge Velásquez (1971, 1975, 1977, 1980, 1985)

Most wins by a trainer:
 6 – James E. Fitzsimmons (1926, 1927, 1929, 1931, 1939, 1940)
 6 – Woody Stephens (1950, 1962, 1976, 1977, 1982, 1983)

Most wins by an owner:
 3 – Wheatley Stable (1927, 1939, 1968)
 3 – Greentree Stable (1930, 1933, 1934)
 3 – Ogden Phipps (1940, 1986, 1988)

Winners

 In 1955, Busher Fantasy finished first, but was disqualified.

References

1923 establishments in New York (state)
Discontinued horse races in New York (state)
Belmont Park
Aqueduct Racetrack
Flat horse races for two-year-olds
Previously graded stakes races in the United States
Recurring sporting events established in 1923
Recurring sporting events disestablished in 2006